The 1971 Soviet Chess Championship was the 39th edition of USSR Chess Championship. Held from 15 September to 18 October 1971 in Leningrad. The tournament was won by Vladimir Savon. It was an amazing result, the title fell to the little-known international master Savon. He only learned the moves at the late age of 13, and lived in a small country settlement where he could find no strong opposition. The final were preceded by semifinals events at Daugavpils, Ivano Frankivsk, Novosibirsk and Perm.

Table and results

References 

USSR Chess Championships
Championship
Chess
1971 in chess
Chess